The Xorai, a manufactured bell metal product is one of the traditional symbols of Assam, which is considered as an article of great respect by the people of Assam. In simplistic terms it is an offering tray with a stand at the bottom which is used in felicitations also. There are Xorais with or without a cover on the top. Hajo and Sarthebari are the most important centers of traditional bell-metal and brass crafts in Assam.

Usage
As an offering tray for tamul-pan (betel nuts and betel leaves) to guests as a sign of welcome and thanks.
As an offering tray for food and other items placed in front of the altar (naamghar) for blessing by the Lord.
As a decorative symbol in traditional functions such as during Bihu dances (modern usage)
As a gift to a person of honour during felicitations (modern usage)

See also
Culture of Assam
Bell and brass metal crafts of Assam
Traditional crafts of Assam
Tamol in Assamese Culture

References 

Culture of Assam
Objects used in Hindu worship